The Chapel of St. Francis of Assisi is a chapel of the Roman Catholic Church located on the Esperanza Base administered by Argentina, on the northern tip of the Antarctic Peninsula in Antarctica. It is one of eight churches on Antarctica. Founded on February 18, 1976, and installed by the Argentine Army, it was the first Catholic chapel of the Antarctic continent.

The chapel provides spiritual support to the residents and staff of the base. Its first priest was the Jesuit Buenaventura De Filippis, born in Italy. This site has been part of several Antarctic milestones, including the first religious marriage, the baptism of Emilio Palma, who was the first recorded birth in Antarctica, and first communion ceremony.

See also
Religion in Antarctica
St. Francis of Assisi Church (disambiguation)

References

Roman Catholic churches completed in 1976
1976 establishments in Antarctica
Roman Catholic chapels in Antarctica
20th-century Roman Catholic church buildings